Uitenhage, officially renamed Kariega, is a South African town in the Eastern Cape Province. It is well known for the Volkswagen factory located there, which is the biggest car factory on the African continent. Along with the city of Port Elizabeth and the small town of Despatch, it forms the Nelson Mandela Metropolitan Municipality.

History

Uitenhage was founded on 25 April 1804 by landdrost (district magistrate) Jacob Glen Cuyler and named in honour of the Cape's Commissioner-General Jacob Abraham Uitenhage de Mist by the Dutch Cape Colony governor, Jan Willem Janssens. Uitenhage formed part of the district of Graaff Reinet (shortly after its short-lived secession).

The Cape Colony received a degree of independence when "Responsible Government" was declared in 1872. In 1875, the Cape government of John Molteno took over the rudimentary Uitenhage railway site, incorporated it into the Cape Government Railways (CGR), and began construction of the lines connecting Uitenhage to Port Elizabeth and the Southern African interior. Two years later in 1877, Uitenhage was declared a municipality.

Nearly a hundred years later, as part of the Republic of South Africa, Uitenhage became a centre for resistance against apartheid. In 1985, police opened fire on a funeral procession in Uitenhage, killing a number of unarmed people, in an event that became notorious as an example of police oppression in South Africa under apartheid.

In 2001 it was incorporated with Port Elizabeth and Despatch into the Nelson Mandela Bay Metropolitan Municipality. On 23 February 2021, Minister of Sports, Arts and Culture, Nathi Mthethwa approved and gazetted the decision to rename Uitenhage to Kariega along with the neighbouring city of Port Elizabeth which was changed to Gqeberha.

Geography

Uitenhage is located 30 km north-west of Port Elizabeth. Its neighbouring town of Despatch and township KwaNobuhle, the city of Port Elizabeth and other surrounding areas form the Nelson Mandela Bay Metropolitan Municipality.

Uitenhage is also located at the beginning of the Mohair Route which stretches to Graaff-Reinet (considered the centre for mohair farming) via Jansenville on Route 75.

Industries

Uitenhage is known for the large industries situated there.  The largest of these industries are the Volkswagen of South Africa and Goodyear factories.  An automotive supplier park, Alexander Park Industrial, has also been created directly next to the Volkswagen factory, thus allowing automotive component manufacturers to construct their manufacturing plants close by.

Transport 

Uitenhage is at the junction of regional and metropolitan routes and has access to many roads.

 The R75 links to Despatch and Port Elizabeth in the south and Jansenville and Graaff-Reinet in the north.
 The M19 links to Despatch, Ibhayi and Swartkops in the east.
 The R334 links to Motherwell and Coega to the east and KwaNobuhle and the R102 (which also connects to the N2 to Humansdorp and Cape Town) in the south-west.
 The M10 links to Despatch, Bethelsdorp and Port Elizabeth in the south.

Notable people 

 Loyiso Bala, South African R&B singer; part of Bala Brothers ground and TKZee
 Mihlali Mosi, professional Rugby Player from Muir College Boys' High School
 Zikhona Bali, actress acts as Asanda on DiepCity
 Linky Boshoff, South African tennis player from Riebeek College Girls' High School
 Okkert Brits, Olympic pole vaulter
 Joseph Petrus Hendrik Crowe, British Army officer who was awarded the Victoria Cross
 Annatjie van Deventer, netball
 Deshun Deysel, international business coach and mountaineer
 Heloise Ferreira, Van Wyk - netball
 Carel Fourie, Springbok rugby wing; from Die Brandwag Hoërskool
 Marie Hayes, netball
 Nantie Hayward, South African cricketer who now plays in the Indian Cricket League
 Allan Hendrickse, preacher-teacher-politician from apartheid politics
 Mcebisi Jonas, former deputy Finance Minister, active member of ANC's Uitenhage branch
 Deon Kayser, rugby player
 Johann van der Merwe, Springbok rugby centre 1969/70 British tour; from Die Brandwag Hoërskool
 Bicks Ndoni, former mayor of Uitenhage and ANC politician
 Smuts Ngonyama, ANC National Spokesman during Thabo Mbeki's Era. Recently appointed South African Ambassador to Spain
 Anrich Nortje, South African cricketer
 Charles Robert Redcliffe, Labour Party politician, community leader and anti-apartheid activist
 Christo van Rensburg, South African tennis player, ATP-ranked
 Enoch Sontonga, composer of Nkosi Sikelel' iAfrika which is now part of the national anthem
 James Wide, double leg amputee railway signalman and owner of Jack the signal-baboon
 Garth Wright, Springbok rugby scrum-half from Muir College
 Lee-Roy Wright, South African actor and television presenter

Notable animals

 Jack – a chacma baboon trained to assist signalman James Wide, who had both legs amputated.

Notable buildings
 Masjid al-Qudama (1849), is one of the oldest mosques in the country.
 Cuyler Manor, historic house museum

Coats of arms

Drostdy — In 1804, the Cape colonial government assigned the shield of Jacob Abraham Uitenhage de Mist's arms to the new Uitenhage drostdy.  The arms were Sable, a cross moline Argent, i.e. a silver cross moline on a black shield.  An anchor was placed behind the shield.  The British authorities discontinued the drostdy seals in 1814, and replaced them with the royal coat of arms.

Municipality — In 1881, the Uitenhage municipal council adopted the De Mist arms, complete with a crest consisting of a cross moline issuing from a gold coronet.  The arms were registered with the Cape Provincial Administration in September 1956 and at the Bureau of Heraldry in June 1994.

Divisional council — The Uitenhage divisional council (the local authority for the rural areas outside the town) assumed a coat of arms in 1968.  The arms were granted by the provincial administrator in August 1968 and registered at the Bureau of Heraldry in June 1972.

On the arms were stated: "Or, a triple crowned tree Vert, the trunk entwined with the Batavian tricolour; on a chief wavy Sable a cross moline  between  dexter  a  pickaxe and hammer in saltire, handles downwards and sinister two scrolls in saltire, Argent." In layman's terms, the design was a golden shield displaying, from top to bottom, a crossed pickaxe and hammer, a cross moline and two crossed scrolls on a black horizontal strip with a wavy edge, and a triple-crowned tree with a Batavian Republic flag wrapped around it.

The crest was an elephant, and the motto Per laborem ad honorem.

References

Bibliography

External links

Populated places in Nelson Mandela Bay
Populated places established in 1804